Đurići is a village in eastern Croatia, located south of Drenovci.

Name
The name of the village in Croatian is plural.

See also
 Vukovar-Syrmia County
Cvelferija

References

Populated places in Vukovar-Syrmia County
Populated places in Syrmia